Belgium entered the Eurovision Song Contest 1999 with Vanessa Chinitor and "Like the Wind". The song was selected to represent Belgium at the contest by winning the Belgium national final Eurosong '99.

Before Eurovision

Eurosong '99 
Eurosong '99 was the national final that selected Belgium's entry in the Eurovision Song Contest 1999. The competition consisted of three semi-finals that took place on 7, 14 and 21 February 1999, followed by a final on 28 February 1999 where the winning song and artist were selected. All four shows took place at the VRT studios in Schelle, hosted by Bart Peeters and broadcast on TV1.

Format 
Three semi-finals took place on 7, 14 and 21 February 1999. From each semi-final, seven entries competed and the winning entry proceeded to the final. After the semi-finals, the highest scoring second-placed entry also proceeded to the final. The final took place on 28 February 1999 where four pre-qualified entries, the semi-final winners and the highest scoring second-placed entry competed and the winner was chosen. The results of all four shows were determined by five voting groups: a three-member expert jury, a Eurojury consisting of European expats living in Belgium, radio voting in Radio 2 and Radio Donna, and public televoting. Each jury had an equal stake in the result and the public televote had a weighting equal to the votes of a single jury. The results of the radio vote in both Radio 2 and Radio Donna were determined by public televoting, which the public was able to vote a week in advance of each show.

During each of the five shows, the expert jury provided commentary and feedback to the artists and selected entries to advance in the competition. These experts were:

 Liliane Saint-Pierre – singer, represented Belgium in the Eurovision Song Contest 1987
 Anja Daems – Radio 2 presenter
 Marcel Vanthilt – singer and television presenter

Competing entries
On 1 November 1998, VRT opened a submission period for artists and composers to submit their songs, with the deadline concluding on 15 December 1998. In addition to the open submissions, VRT also directly invited composers to submit songs as pre-qualified finalists. 199 entries were submitted, and on 12 January 1999, the broadcaster announced the twenty-five entries selected for the competition.

Semi-final 1
The first semi-final took place on 7 February 1999. "Like the Wind" performed by Vanessa Chinitor proceeded to the final.

Semi-final 2
The second semi-final took place on 14 February 1999. "Never Give Up" performed by Wendy Fierce proceeded to the final. "This Is My Life" performed by Voice Male also proceeded to the final as the highest scoring second-placed entry.

Semi-final 3
The third semi-final took place on 21 February 1999. "Get Ready for the Sunsand" performed by Alana Dante proceeded to the final.

Final
The final took place on 28 February 1999 where the four semi-final qualifiers alongside the four pre-qualified entries competed. "Like the Wind" performed by Vanessa Chinitor was selected as the winner.

At Eurovision
Chinitor performed second on the night of the contest, following Lithuania and preceding Spain. "Like The Wind" received 38 points, placing 12th in a field on 23.

Voting

References

External links
Belgium National Final 1999

1999
Countries in the Eurovision Song Contest 1999
Eurovision